Cogels is a surname. Notable people with the surname include:

 Fredegand Cogels (1850–1932), Belgian politician 
 Joseph Charles Cogels (1786–1831), Belgian painter
 Joseph Cogels (1894–1978), Belgian sport shooter
  (1900–1953), Belgian explorer and author